Elmont is an unincorporated community in Hanover County in the Central Region of the U.S. state of Virginia. It was located on the former Richmond, Fredericksburg and Potomac Railroad, now owned by CSX Transportation. Elmont was located on the old Washington Highway, and was served by an electric trolley car line between Richmond and Ashland.

Formerly consisting primarily of farmland, today Elmont is a community with many residents who commute to jobs in the metropolitan Richmond area.

External links
 The Elmont, VA Community Group on Facebook
Hanover County Economic Development

Unincorporated communities in Hanover County, Virginia
Unincorporated communities in Virginia